Sapphoa is a genus of flowering plants in the family Acanthaceae, native to Cuba. Adapted to serpentine soils, they are nickel hyperaccumulators.

Species
Currently accepted species include:

Sapphoa ekmanii Borhidi
Sapphoa rigidifolia Urb.

References

Acanthaceae
Acanthaceae genera
Endemic flora of Cuba